Diplomatic missions of Korea may refer to:
 Diplomatic missions of North Korea
 Diplomatic missions of South Korea